The Austria B national football team was a secondary men's national football team which represented the Austria. It was used to try out and develop players for potential inclusion in the first team. Its matches are not considered full internationals.

History
The B team played its first match on 10 April 1927 against Hungary, a 1–1 draw. They played their final match on 1 April 1980 against West Germany, which finished as a 0–3 loss. The team was subsequently replaced by the Austria under-21 national team.

Matches
The Austria B team are known to have played the following matches.

References

B
European national B association football teams